Artisanal fishing (or traditional/subsistence fishing) consists of various small-scale, low-technology, low-capital, fishing practices undertaken by individual fishing households (as opposed to commercial fishing). Many of these households are of coastal or island ethnic groups. These households make short (rarely overnight) fishing trips close to the shore. Their produce is usually not processed and is mainly for local consumption. Artisan fishing uses traditional fishing techniques such as rod and tackle, fishing arrows and harpoons, cast nets, and small (if any) traditional fishing boats. For that reason, socio-economic status of  artisanal fishing community has become an interest of the authorities in recent years.

Artisan fishing may be undertaken for both commercial and subsistence reasons. It contrasts with large-scale modern commercial fishing practices in that it is often less wasteful and less stressful on fish populations than modern industrial fishing. Target 14.b of Sustainable Development Goal 14 works to provide access rights to artisanal fishers on marine resources and markets.

Importance
Hundreds of millions of people around the world rely on artisanal fisheries to live. Artisanal fishing is critically important for not only food, but for jobs, income, nutrition, food security, sustainable livelihoods, and poverty alleviation as well. Artisanal fisheries are the predominant form of fisheries in "tropical developing countries" such as Nigeria.

The importance of artisanal and small-scale fisheries have been recognized in the first internationally agreed instrument dedicated entirely to small-scale fisheries. This agreement, drafted by the Food and Agriculture Organization of the United Nations is titled the Voluntary Guidelines for Securing Sustainable Small-Scale Fisheries in the Context of Food Security and Poverty Eradication and was implemented in 2015. In addition, there is increased global advocacy to provide access for small-scale artisanal fishers to marine resources and market, this is one of the major targets of the United Nations Sustainable Development Goal 14.

Artisan fishing boats and gears

Nigeria 
A traditional dug out canoe between 3–18 meters long is used in Nigeria for artisanal fishing. Artisanal fishers in this area use gear that included, "cast nets, handlines, basket traps, longlines, set gillnets and beach and purse seines."

Sudan 

Fishing vessels used in Sudan include from the sharoaq, feluka and murkab al hadeed. Equipment varies by region and includes fixed nets, drift nets, seine nets, long line and cast nets.

Techniques

See more 

 2004 Indian Ocean earthquake and tsunami
 Artisanal food
 Blue justice
 Community-supported fishery
 Corf
 Fishing
 Fishing weir
 Fishing village
 Recreational fishing
 Rock fishing
 Traditional fishing boat

References

Sources
 FAO: Definition: Artisanal fisheries
 Béné, C; Macfadyen, G; Allison, E H (2007) Increasing the contribution of small-scale fisheries to poverty alleviation and food security FAO Fisheries Technical Paper T481. 
 Diegues, Antonio Carlos (2002) Sea Tenure, traditional knowledge and management among brazilian artisanal fishermen.  NUPAUB, University of São Paulo. Retrieved 25 April 2008.
 Pauly, D (2006)  Major trends in small-scale marine fisheries, with emphasis on developing countries, and some implications for the social sciences Maritime Studies (MAST) 4(2): 7–22. 
 Tietze, U; Siar, S; Upare, Suchitra M and Upare, M A (2007) Livelihood and micro-enterprise development opportunities for women in coastal fishing communities in India FAO Fisheries Circulars C1021.

External links
 OAS: Report on fisheries including artisan fishing
 WorldFish Center: Resilient Small-Scale Fisheries
 CGIAR Research Program on Fish Agri-Food Systems: Small-Scale Fisheries 

Fishing industry